Stenhammar is a palace and mansion located outside Flen in Södermanland County, Sweden, about 120 kilometers southwest of Stockholm. It is situated right by the Western Main Line railway (Västra stambanan).

Stenhammar is owned by the State and it has been leased to King Carl XVI Gustaf since 1966, but is not considered a crown palace. The previous leaseholder was Prince Wilhelm, Duke of Södermanland (younger brother of the Kings' paternal grandfather) who lived there and held it until his death. Stenhammar was donated to the State by landowner and courtier Robert von Kræmer in 1903, and the will stipulates that it should be leased out to a Prince of the Royal House, preferably a Duke of Södermanland, if there is one.

See also
List of palaces in Sweden
Harpsund

References

External link
 stenhammarsgods.se

Castles in Södermanland County
Crown palaces in Sweden
Manor houses in Sweden